Carole Joan White (1 April 1943 – 16 September 1991) was an English actress.

She achieved a public profile with her performances in the television play Cathy Come Home (1966) and the films Poor Cow (1967) and I'll Never Forget What's 'isname (1967), but alcoholism and drug abuse damaged her career, and from the early 1970s she worked infrequently.

Life and career
White, the daughter of a scrap merchant, was born in Hammersmith, London, and  attended the Corona Stage Academy.  She played minor roles in films from 1949 until the late 1950s, when she began to play more substantial supporting roles in films such as Carry on Teacher (1959) and Never Let Go (1960) in which she played the girlfriend of Peter Sellers. She also acted the part of Evelyn May, a ‘girl in the bar’ and court witness in Sidney J Furie’s “The Boys” (1962)

She continued working regularly, and drew attention for her performances in the television version of Nell Dunn's Up the Junction (1965). She followed this success with roles in Cathy Come Home (1966) and the films Poor Cow (1967), based on another Nell Dunn book, and I'll Never Forget What's'isname (1967).  Up the Junction, Cathy Come Home and Poor Cow were all directed by Ken Loach.

White starred opposite Alan Bates, Dirk Bogarde and Ian Holm in the film adaptation of Bernard Malamud's The Fixer (1968) and then travelled to Hollywood in 1968 to make Daddy's Gone A-Hunting (1969). She appeared in a Dean Martin western film, Something Big (1971), and had major roles in Dulcima, alongside John Mills and            Stuart Wilson (1971), and Made (1972), with the singer Roy Harper. During the late 1960s, White was considered one of the most promising actresses in British cinema, but her alcoholism and substance abuse, as well as unhappy relationships with male stars such as Richard Burton, Frank Sinatra, Oliver Reed and Paul Burke, hindered her career. She did, however, have a prominent role as a hostage in The Squeeze (1977).

After living in Hollywood for several years, White returned to London to star in Nell Dunn's play Steaming, at the Comedy Theatre in the West End, and filmed Nutcracker at the same time.  Despite receiving excellent reviews for Steaming, she was often late, missed performances, and was finally sacked. In 1982, a biography, Carol Comes Home, by Clifford Thurlow, was published. Although White received publicity for the play and the biography, she was unable to revive her career. She returned to the United States, where she lived for the remainder of her life.

Death
White died in 1991 in Florida, at the age of 48. The cause of her death is disputed, with some sources claiming she took a drug overdose, and others (The Sunday Times in 1991 and Upton writing in 2004) suggesting she succumbed to liver disease from chronic alcoholism.  She had two sons from her first marriage.

A television film of her life, The Battersea Bardot, was shown in 1994, with White portrayed by Wendy Morgan.

Filmography

Kind Hearts and Coronets (1949) – Young Sibella (uncredited)
Doctor in the House (1954) – Bit Role (uncredited)
The Belles of St Trinian's (1954) – Schoolgirl (uncredited)
A Prize of Gold (1955) – German Refugee (uncredited)
Doctor at Sea (1955) – Bit Role (uncredited)
An Alligator Named Daisy (1955) – Girl (uncredited)
Now and Forever (1956) – Bit Part (uncredited)
My Teenage Daughter (1956) – Minor Role (uncredited)
Moby Dick (1956) – Young Girl (uncredited)
Circus Friends (1956) – Nan
Around the World in 80 Days (1956) – Minor Role (uncredited)
Blue Murder at St. Trinian's (1957) – Schoolgirl (uncredited)
The Golden Disc (1958) – Bit Part (uncredited)
The 39 Steps (1959) – Schoolgirl in Assembly Hall (uncredited)
Web of Suspicion (1959) – (uncredited)
Carry On Teacher (1959) – Sheila Dale – Saboteur
Never Let Go (1960) – Jackie
Beat Girl (1960) – Girl at The Off-Beat Café (uncredited)
Surprise Package (1960) – Sexy Teenager (uncredited)
Linda (1960) – Linda
The Man in the Back Seat (1961) – Jean
A Matter of WHO (1961) – Beryl
All Night Long (1962) – Lucille (uncredited)
Village of Daughters (1962) – Natasha Passoti (A Daughter)
 Gaolbreak (1962) – Carol Marshall
Bon Voyage! (1962) – Penelope Walthorne (uncredited)
The Boys (1962) – Evelyn May
Ladies Who Do (1963) – Sandra
Gideon's Way (1964, TV episode "The Rhyme and the Reason") – Winifred Norton
A Hard Day's Night (1964) – Minor Role (uncredited)
The Playground (1965) – Virginia Williams
Up the Junction (1965, TV) – Sylvie
Cathy Come Home (1966, TV) – Cathy
Prehistoric Women (1967) – Gido
Poor Cow (1967) – Joy
I'll Never Forget What's'isname (1967) – Georgina Elben
The Fixer (1968) – Raisl
Daddy's Gone A-Hunting (1969) – Cathy Palmer
The Man Who Had Power Over Women (1970) – Jody Pringle
Dulcima (1971) – Dulcima Gaskain
Something Big (1971) – Dover McBride
Made (1972) – Valerie Marshall
Some Call It Loving (1973) – Scarlett
The Squeeze (1977) – Jill
Nutcracker (1982) – Margaux Lasselle (final film role)

References

External links

1943 births
English film actresses
English television actresses
20th-century English actresses
1991 deaths
20th-century British businesspeople